The Old Hall Hotel is a hotel in Buxton, Derbyshire, England, and is one of the oldest buildings in the town.
The current building dates from the Restoration period, built around and incorporating an earlier fortified tower.

According to the Derbyshire Archeological Journal (1994): "In the national context, the survival of a building which accommodated both Mary Queen of Scots and much of the Elizabethan nobility is of considerable note.  Its importance in architectural terms is further enhanced as it is believed to be the earliest known British building of cross-axial form."

History of the building

Since at least the Middle Ages, a hall has stood on this site by the warm spring for which Buxton water is known.  The oldest part of the current building was once part of a four-storey  fortified tower, built in 1573 by Bess of Hardwick and her fourth husband, George Talbot, 6th Earl of Shrewsbury.

The tower was used at times between 1576 and 1578 to house Mary Queen of Scots, whilst she was in the custody of the Earl on the orders of Queen Elizabeth I. Her last visit to Buxton was in the summer of 1584. It is claimed that it was Mary who inscribed the following couplet to Buxton on a window pane:
Buxton, whose warm waters have made thy name famous, perchance I shall visit thee no more – Farewell.
The inscription can still be seen in the window of room 26.

The Hall was rebuilt by one of Bess of Hardwick's descendants, the first Duke of Devonshire, in 1670.

Use as a hotel
By 1727, the Old Hall had become a hotel, the only one in Buxton, where the writer Daniel Defoe stayed on his tour of Great Britain. Of the Hall he wrote: "The Duke of Devonshire ... has built a large handsome house at the bath, where there is convenient lodging, and very good provisions, and an ordinary well served for one shilling per head; but it is but one."

By the time that the nearby Georgian Crescent was built (1780–86), Buxton had become an established spa town; and the Old Hall had become a fashionable hotel for the Georgian aristocracy taking the waters. In 1791 one James Cumming (father of the noted chemist James Cumming) leased what was then called Buxton Hall Hotel from the fifth Duke in 1791. He was considered socially more than a mere hotelier, and the hotel's clientele included bishops and visiting aristocracy. The Old Hall has served as a hotel ever since.

See also
Grade II* listed buildings in High Peak
Listed buildings in Buxton

References

External links

 The Historic Old Hall Hotel, Buxton: History of the Hotel
 

Hotels in Derbyshire
Buildings and structures in Buxton
Country houses in Derbyshire
Grade II* listed buildings in Derbyshire
Country house hotels